El-P (real name Jaime Meline, also known as El-Producto) is a New York-based hip hop artist and co-founder, owner, and CEO of Definitive Jux Records.  His discography consists of three solo studio albums, five instrumental albums, two mix tapes, and eleven singles. He has also appeared on numerous other artist's recordings as either a guest vocalist or producer. Releases from Company Flow, The Weathermen, and Run the Jewels, all of which El-P has been a member, are not included in this discography: only solo material.

El-P's early career and rise to prominence was as part of Company Flow, formed in 1992, consisting of El-P, Mr. Len, Bigg Jus.  Following the break-up of the group, El-P started his own record label, Definitive Jux.  El-P produced early records from the label, including  Cannibal Ox's critically acclaimed The Cold Vein and his own debut solo album, Fantastic Damage.  El-P released his second solo album, I'll Sleep When You're Dead, in 2007.

El-P has contributed as producer and guest vocalist to albums by artists such as DJ Krush, Aesop Rock, Murs, Cage, Mr. Lif, Prefuse 73, Del tha Funkee Homosapien, Mike Ladd, and Atmosphere, among many others.  He collaborated with Alec Empire on the first Handsome Boy Modeling School album and with Cage and Chino Moreno on the second.  El-P also provided the soundtrack for the graffiti film Bomb the System.

Albums

Studio albums
{|class="wikitable"
! rowspan="2" style="width:33px;"|Year
! rowspan="2" style="width:260px;"|Title
! colspan="5"|Peak chart positions
! rowspan="2"| Notes
|-
!style="width:3em;font-size:75%"|US
!style="width:3em;font-size:75%"|US R&B
!style="width:3em;font-size:75%"|US Heat.
!style="width:3em;font-size:75%"|US Ind.
!style="width:3em;font-size:75%"|US Int.
|-
|align:"center"|2002
|Fantastic Damage
Released: May 14, 2002
Label: Definitive Jux (DJX #27)
| style="text-align:center;"|198
| style="text-align:center;"|82
| style="text-align:center;"|9
| style="text-align:center;"|14
| style="text-align:center;"|—
|
|-
|align="center"|2007
|I'll Sleep When You're Dead
Released: March 20, 2007
Label: Definitive Jux (DJX #137)
| style="text-align:center;"|78
| style="text-align:center;"|55
| style="text-align:center;"|—
| style="text-align:center;"|6
| style="text-align:center;"|78
|
|-
|align="center"|2012
|Cancer 4 Cure
Released: May 22, 2012
Label: Fat Possum Records
| style="text-align:center;"|71
| style="text-align:center;"|7
| style="text-align:center;"|—
| style="text-align:center;"|15
| style="text-align:center;"|—
|
|-
| colspan="8" style="text-align:center; font-size:8pt;"| "—" denotes releases that did not chart.
|}

Instrumental albums
{|class="wikitable"
! style="width:33px;"|Year
! style="width:260px;"|Title
! style="font-size:90%"|US Ind. peak
! Notes
|-
| style="text-align:center;" rowspan="2"| 2002
|El-P Presents CannibalOxtrumentals
Released: March 19, 2002
Label: Definitive Jux (DJX #24)
| style="text-align:center;"|—
|
Instrumental version of The Cold Vein by Cannibal Ox (2001).
|-
|FanDam Plus
Released: October 1, 2002
Label: Definitive Jux (DJX #39)
| style="text-align:center;"|—
|
Instrumental version of Fantastic Damage.
Also includes a second disc with remixes, lyrics, and video footage.
|-
| style="text-align:center;" rowspan="2"|2004
|High Water
Released: March 9, 2004
Label: Thirsty Ear Recordings
| style="text-align:center;"|46
|
Made in conjunction with jazz pianist Matthew Shipp and The Blue Series Continuum.
|-
|Collecting the Kid
Released: October 19, 2004
Label: Definitive Jux (DJX #99)
| style="text-align:center;"|—
|
Limited-edition album collecting instrumentals from various side projects such as  High Water, Bomb the System soundtrack, and Central Services.
|-
| style="text-align:center;" rowspan="1"| 2010
|Weareallgoingtoburninhellmegamixx3
Label: Gold Dust 
| style="text-align:center;"|—
|
Third installment in the Weareallgoingtoburninhellmeggamixx series.
|-
| style="text-align:center;" rowspan="1"| 2020
|Capone (Original Motion Picture Soundtrack)
Label: Milan Records
| style="text-align:center;"|—
|
Original score to the Josh Trank film
|-
| colspan="4" style="text-align:center; font-size:8pt;"| "—" denotes releases that did not chart.
|}

Miscellaneous
{|class="wikitable"
! style="width:33px;"|Year
! style="width:260px;"|Title
! Notes
|-
| style="text-align:center;"| 2001
|Shards of Pol-Pottery(with Alec Empire)
Label: Digital HardcoreRecordings
|
Extended play featuring a re-production of the song "Megaton B-Boy" from the 1999Handsome Boy Modelling School album So... How's Your Girl?.
Features 12 versions of the song, including remixes, instrumentals, and ana cappella.
|-
| style="text-align:center;"| 2003
|Weareallgoingtoburninhell
Label: Definitive Jux
|
Mixtape sold only at shows, by the New York native shortly after September 11, 2001.
|-
| style="text-align:center;"| 2008
|Weareallgoingtoburninhellmegamixx2
Label: Definitive Jux
|
Double CD mixtape sold only at shows.
|}

Singles
{| class="wikitable"
! style="width:33px;"|Year
! style="width:215px;"|Title
! style="width:180px;"|Album
|-
| style="text-align:center;"| 2001
| "Stepfather Factory"
| rowspan="4"| Fantastic Damage
|-
| style="text-align:center;" rowspan="5"|2002
| "Deep Space 9mm"
|-
| "Dead Disnee"
|-
| "Truancy"
|-
| "Remix'd"
| FanDam Plus
|-
| "Dead Light"
| non-album single
|-
| style="text-align:center;"| 2003
|"Sunrise over Bklyn"
|High Water
|-
| style="text-align:center;"| 2004
| "Jukie Skate Rock"
| Collecting the Kid
|-
| style="text-align:center;"| 2006
|"Everything Must Go"
| rowspan="4"| I'll Sleep When You're Dead
|-
| style="text-align:center;" rowspan="3"| 2007
|"Smithereens"
|-
|"Flyentology"
|-
|"The Overly Dramatic Truth"
|-
| style="text-align:center;"| 2012
| "The Full Retard"
| Cancer 4 Cure
|}

Guest appearances
{|class="wikitable"
! style="width:33px;"|Year
! style="width:215px;"|Track(s)
! style="width:230px;"|Album
! style="width:150px;"|Artist(s)
|-
| style="text-align:center;"|1998
|"Trapped in Three Dimensions"
|Bad Blood
|Ice
|-
| style="text-align:center;" rowspan="2"|1999
|"Looking Over a City"
|Quannum Spectrum
|various artists
|-
|"Megaton B-Boy"
|So... How's Your Girl?
|Handsome Boy Modeling School
|-
| style="text-align:center;"|2000
|"Offspring"†
|Both Sides of the Brain
|Del tha Funkee Homosapien
|-
| style="text-align:center;" rowspan="6"|2001
|"Homecoming"
|Lucy Ford: The Atmosphere EPs
|Atmosphere
|-
|
"Ox Out the Cage"†
"Ridiculoid"†
|The Cold Vein
|Cannibal Ox
|-
|"Vision of Art"
|Zen
|DJ Krush
|-
|"Phantom"†
|Emergency Rations
|Mr. Lif
|-
|"We Can Build You"
|The Brotherhood of the Bomb
|Techno Animal
|-
|"El-P & J-Treds Freestyle(Interlude) [Live]"
|Farewell Fondle 'Em
|various artists
|-
| style="text-align:center;"|2002
|"Post Mortem"†
|I Phantom
|Mr. Lif
|-
| style="text-align:center;" rowspan="3"|2003
|"The Dance"†
|The End of the Beginning
|MURS
|-
|"Suburb Party"
|Beauty Party
|The Majesticons
|-
|"We're Famous"†
|Bazooka Tooth
|Aesop Rock
|-
| style="text-align:center;" rowspan="2"| 2004
|
"WMR"†
"Oxycontin, Pt. 2"†
|Def Jux Presents 3
|various artists
|-
|"The Hours"
|White People
|Handsome Boy Modeling School
|-
| style="text-align:center;" rowspan="4"| 2005
|"Rickety Rackety"
|Fast Cars, Danger, Fire and Knives
|Aesop Rock
|-
|"First Words Worse"
|Year of the Beast
|C-Rayz Walz
|-
|"Hideyaface"
|Surrounded by Silence
|Prefuse 73
|-
|"Good Morning"†
"Left It to Us"
|Hell's Winter
|Cage
|-
| style="text-align:center;"|2006
|
"Take, Hold, Fire"†
|Mo' Mega
|Mr. Lif
|-
| style="text-align:center;"|2007
|
"39 Thieves"
"Gun for the Whole Family"†
|None Shall Pass
|Aesop Rock
|-
| style="text-align:center;"|2008
|
"All the Cash"
|They Live
|Evil Nine
|-
| style="text-align:center;"|2010
|
"Sit Down, Man"
|Sit Down, Man
|Das Racist
|-
| style="text-align:center;" rowspan="2"| 2011
|
"The Last Huzzah!"
|Lost in Translation
|Mr. Muthafuckin' eXquire
|-
|"Shut Up, Man"†
|Relax
|Das Racist
|-
| style="text-align:center;" rowspan="3"|2012
|"Butane (Champion's Anthem)"†
|R.A.P. Music
|Killer Mike
|-
|"Shit Starters"
|Payback
|Danny!
|-
|"Telephuck" (featuring Gucci Mane)†
|Power & Passion
|Mr. Muthafuckin' eXquire
|-
| style="text-align:center;" rowspan="3"|2022
|"Heavy Water" (featuring Breeze Brewin)
|Aethiopes
|Billy Woods
|}
"†" denotes tracks which also feature production by El-P.

Remixes
{|class="wikitable"
! style="width:33px;"|Year
! style="width:215px;"|Remixed track
! style="width:230px;"|Released on
! style="width:150px;"|Artist(s)
|-
| style="text-align:center;"| 2004
|"Beatslope"
|Def Jux Presents 3
|Hangar 18
|-
| style="text-align:center;" rowspan="4"|2005
|"Goodnight Goodnight"
|
"Goodnight Goodnight" single
"Middle of Nowhere" single
|Hot Hot Heat
|-
|"Hideyaface"
|"Hideyaface" single
|Prefuse 73
|-
|"Only"
|
"Only" 12-inch vinyl
"Every Day is Exactly the Same" single
|Nine Inch Nails
|-
|"Scarecrow"
|Guerolito
|Beck
|-
| style="text-align:center;" rowspan="3"|2006
|"Fondle 'em Fossils"
|Bucket of B-Sides Vol. 1
|Various artists
|-
|"Hours"
|Return to Cookie Mountain (US version)
|TV on the Radio
|-
|"Someday Sometimes"
|Syd Matters
|Syd Matters
|-
| style="text-align:center;"|2007
|"Where's Da G's"
|Maths + English
|Dizzee Rascal
|-
| style="text-align:center;"|2008
|"Goliath"
|The Bedlam in Goliath
|The Mars Volta
|-
| style="text-align:center;"|2009
|"I Got This"
|ATL RMX
|Young Jeezy
|-
| style="text-align:center;"|2012
|"Hammer Dance"
|The Leak
|Slaughterhouse (group)
|-
| style="text-align:center;"| 2018
|"Supercut (El-P Remix) Feat. Run the Jewels"
|Single
|Lorde
|}

Production credits

{| class="wikitable"
! style="width:33px;"|Year
! style="width:215px;"|Track(s)
! style="width:230px;"|Album
! style="width:150px;"|Artist
|-
| style="text-align:center;" rowspan="2"|2000
|"Offspring"†
|Both Sides of the Brain
|Del tha Funkee Homosapien
|-
|"Arise"
|Enters the Colossus
|Mr. Lif
|-
| style="text-align:center;" rowspan="4"|2001
| style="text-align:center;"|—
|Def Jux Presents
|various artists
|-
| style="text-align:center;"|—
|The Cold VeinEl-P Presents Cannibal Oxtrumentals
|Cannibal Ox
|-
|
"Paper Mache"
"Nonstop"
|Paper Mache 12"
|Masai Bey
|-
|
"The F Word"
"Life's Ill"
"Metal Gear"
|The F Word 12"
|Cannibal Ox
|-
| style="text-align:center;" rowspan="5"|2002
|"Nickel Plated Pockets"
|Daylight
|Aesop Rock
|-
| style="text-align:center;"|—
|Def Jux Presents 2
|various artists
|-
|"Phantom"†
|Emergency Rations
|Mr. Lif
|-
|"Holdin a Jar 2"
|Movies for the Blind
|Cage
|-
|
"A Glimpse at the Struggle"
"Return of the B-Boy"
"Success"
"Daddy Dearest"
"The Now"
"Post Mortem"†
|I PhantomI Phantom Instrumentals
|Mr. Lif
|-
| style="text-align:center;" rowspan="4"|2003
|
"The Dance"†
"Def Cover"
|The End of the Beginning
|Murs
|-
|"Illy"
|Smashy Trashy
|S.A. Smash
|-
| style="text-align:center;"|—
|Ravipops (The Substance)
|C-Rayz Walz
|-
|"We're Famous"†
|Bazooka Tooth
|Aesop Rock
|-
| style="text-align:center;" rowspan="5"|2004
| style="text-align:center;"|—
|Def Jux Presents 3
|various artists
|-
| style="text-align:center;"|—
|Murs 3:16: The 9th Edition
|MURS
|-
|"Submerged"
|Waterworld
|Leak Bros.
|-
| style="text-align:center;"|—
|Telicatessen
|Rob Sonic
|-
| style="text-align:center;"|—
|We Live: The Black Samurai
|C-Rayz Walz
|-
| style="text-align:center;" rowspan="4"| 2005
|
"People 4 Prez"
"Blō"
"Frame Rupture"
|Black Dialogue
|The Perceptionists
|-
|"Paradise"
|Year of the Beast
|C-Rayz Walz
|-
|
"Good Morning"†
"Too Heavy for Cherubs"‡
"Stripes"‡
"Perfect World" (asCentral Services)‡
"Subtle Art of the Breakup Song"
"Lord Have Mercy"
"Hell's Winter"
|Hell's Winter
|Cage
|-
|
"Vein"
"Raspberry Fields"
"From the Planet of Eat"
|Return of the Ox: Live at CMJ
|Cannibal OX
|-
| style="text-align:center;" rowspan="3"|2006
|
"Collapse"
"Ultra Mega"
"Brothaz"
"The Fries"
"Take, Hold, Fire"†
"Long Distance"
"Mo' Mega"
"Looking In"
|Mo' Mega
|Mr. Lif
|-
|"Sneak Preview"
|Sleepyheads II
|various artists (Mr. Lif)
|-
|"Smalltown"
|Slow Suicide Stimulus
|Slow Suicide Stimulus
|-
| style="text-align:center;"|2007
|"Gun for the Whole Family"†
|None Shall Pass
|Aesop Rock
|-
| style="text-align:center;"|2009
|
"Nothing Left to Say"
"I Lost It in Havertown"
"Teenage Hands"‡
"Eating Its Way Out of Me"
|Depart From Me
|Cage
|-
| style="text-align:center;"|2010
|"Mean Streak"
|Crown of Thorns
|Rakaa
|-
| style="text-align:center;" rowspan="2"|2011
|"Shut Up, Man"†
|Relax
|Das Racist
|-
|
"Fire Marshall Bill"
"Chicken Spot Rock"
"Cockmeat Sandwich/Pissin' Between Train Cars"
"Build-A-Bitch"
"No Time"
|Lost in Translation
|Mr. Muthafuckin' eXquire
|-
| style="text-align:center;"|2012
| style="text-align:center;"|—
|R.A.P. Music
|Killer Mike
|-
| style="text-align:center;"|2015
| style="text-align:center;"|"Another Body"‡
|Fantastic Four (Original Motion Picture Soundtrack)
|Marco Beltrami and Philip Glass

|-
| style="text-align:center;"|2016
|
"Axolotl"
"Iodine & Iron"
|Total Depravity
|The Veils
|}
"—" denotes production or executive-production credit for the entire album/release.
"†" denotes tracks which also feature vocal performances by El-P.
"‡" denotes credit as co-producer or additional production.

Music videos
{|class="wikitable"
! style="width:33px;"|Year
! style="width:215px;"| Song
! style="width:180px;"| Director
|-
| style="text-align:center;"|2002
|"Deep Space 9mm"
|Brian Beletic
|-
| style="text-align:center;"|2003
|"Stepfather Factory"
|Plates Animation
|-
| style="text-align:center;" rowspan="2"|2007
|"Smithereens"
|Cassidy Gearhart
|-
|"Flyentology"
|Daniel Garcia and Nathan Love
|-
| style="text-align:center;"|2010
|"Time Won't Tell"
|Shan Nicholson
|-
| style="text-align:center;"|2012
|"The Full Retard"
|Timothy Saccenti
|-
| style="text-align:center;"|2012
|"Stay Down"
|Timothy Saccenti
|}

See also
Definitive Jux discography
Run the Jewels discography

References

General

Specific

External links
El-P at Definitive Jux

Hip hop discographies
Discographies of American artists
 
Production discographies